The 2012 Men's South American Volleyball Club Championship was the fourth official edition of the men's volleyball tournament, played by eight teams over 5–9 August 2012 in Ignacio Carrera Pinto Gymnassium in Linares, Chile. The winning team qualified for the 2012 FIVB Volleyball Men's Club World Championship.

Pools composition
Teams were seeded according to how the country representing finished in the last tournament.

Preliminary round

Pool A

Pool B

Final round

Semifinals

7th place match

5th place match

3rd place match

Final

Final standing

References

Volleyball
Men's South American Volleyball Club Championship
Volleyball
Men's South American Volleyball Club Championship